The Painted Veil is a 2006 American drama film directed by John Curran. The screenplay by Ron Nyswaner is based on the 1925 novel of the same title by W. Somerset Maugham. Edward Norton, Naomi Watts, Toby Jones, Anthony Wong Chau Sang and Liev Schreiber appear in the leading roles.

This is the third film adaptation of the Maugham book, following a 1934 film starring Greta Garbo and Herbert Marshall and a 1957 version called The Seventh Sin with Bill Travers and Eleanor Parker.

Plot
On a brief trip to London in the early 1920s, earnest and bookish bacteriologist Walter Fane is dazzled by Kitty Garstin, a London socialite. He proposes; she accepts ("only to get as far away from [her] mother as possible"), and the couple have a honeymoon in Venice. They travel to Walter's medical post in Shanghai, where he is stationed in a government lab studying infectious diseases. They are ill-suited, with Kitty much more interested in parties and the social life of the British expatriate community.

She meets Charles Townsend, a married British vice consul, and they have an affair. When Walter finds out, he threatens divorce for adultery unless she accompanies him to a village in a remote area of China where he has volunteered to treat victims of an unchecked cholera epidemic. Kitty begs for a quiet divorce, which he initially refuses, but later says only if Townsend will leave his wife Dorothy to marry her. Charles declines to accept, despite earlier claiming his love for Kitty.

The couple embark upon an arduous, two-week-long overland journey to the mountainous inland region, which is considerably faster and much easier if they traveled by river, but Walter is determined to make Kitty as uncomfortable as possible. Upon their arrival in Mei-tan-fu, she discovers they will be living in near-squalor, far removed from the town. Their cheerful neighbor Waddington is a British deputy commissioner living in relative opulence with Wan Xi, a young Chinese woman.

Walter and Kitty barely speak. Except for a cook and a Chinese soldier assigned to guard her during unrest due to the Chinese civil war, she is alone for long hours. After visiting an orphanage run by a group of French nuns, Kitty volunteers and she is assigned to work in the music room. She is surprised to learn from the Mother Superior that her husband loves children, especially babies. She begins to see him differently, that he can be unselfish and caring. When he sees her with the children, he also realizes she is not as shallow and selfish as he had thought. Their marriage begins to blossom in the midst of the epidemic. She soon learns she is pregnant, but is unsure who the father is. Walter – in love with Kitty again – assures her it doesn't matter.

The cholera epidemic takes many victims. Just as Walter and the locals are starting to get it under control – due to his creating a system of aqueducts to transport clean water – cholera-carrying refugees from elsewhere arrive in the area, and Walter sets up a camp for them outside town. He contracts the disease and Kitty lovingly nurses him, but he dies, and she is devastated. Bereft and pregnant, she leaves China.

Five years later, Kitty is seen in London, well-dressed and apparently happy, shopping with her young son, Walter. They are picking flowers for their visit to Walter's grandfather. They meet Townsend by chance on the street, and he suggests that Kitty meet with him. Asking young Walter his age, he realizes from the reply that he might be the boy's father.

Kitty rejects his overtures and walks away. When her son asks who Townsend is, she replies: "No one important, darling".

Cast

Production

Development
Prior to 1999, producer Sara Colleton sought to develop a script for The Painted Veil. The script frequently was redrafted as it was intended both to be close to the source material and to take liberties with the source material, specifically to create a feminist version. Actor Edward Norton became involved with the project in 1999. Norton discussed why he liked the project,
"It's very much a story about people getting beyond the worst in themselves and figuring out how to look at each other honestly, forgive each other for their failings and get to a better place... When I read it, I was very affected by it because in it I saw my own failings."

He suggested casting Naomi Watts for the role of Kitty, but this decision did not take place until after she proved herself a bankable star with her performances in Mulholland Drive (2001) and 21 Grams (2003). When Watts joined the project, she recommended director John Curran, with whom she had collaborated on the 2004 film We Don't Live Here Anymore. The director's expertise with that work convinced Watts and Norton that he would be capable of depicting the dysfunctional relationship in The Painted Veil.

The project began development at producers Bob Yari and Mark Gordon's Stratus Film Company, but when Stratus executive Mark Gill left to start Warner Independent Pictures, he took the project with him. Gill began production of the film in partnership with Yari. Gill was later fired before the film's completion by Warner Bros. production president Jeff Robinov. This was said to contribute to the film's marketing difficulties.

Yari and Warner Independent Pictures collaborated with a Chinese partner who was granted approval over the script and the finished film. The partnership permitted a budget of $19 million for The Painted Veil. When the Chinese production company reviewed the film, its representatives were unhappy with the depiction of the Chinese uprising and the cholera victims, requesting that the scenes be revised. Norton and Curran expressed concerns that their studio accepted the censorship too quickly, with the director threatening to remove his name from the film. Their pressure resulted in limiting cuts from the film to 38 seconds.

Writing
Screenwriter Ron Nyswaner and Norton collaborated on the screenplay for the film. They considered the 1925 novel by W. Somerset Maugham to be one-dimensional. Norton expanded the character of Walter Fane, giving him an enhanced role. He also had Walter make peace with his wife Kitty, leading to them falling in love with each other. Norton explaine, "I like to think that we didn't change the book so much as liberate it. We just imagined it on a slightly bigger scale, and made external some of what is internal in the novel." Norton described the novel as "almost unremittingly bleak" and believed that the author had thought that British colonials were unlikely to change. The actor said of his changes, "I went on the assumption that if you were willing to allow Walter and Kitty to grow... you had the potential for a love story that was both tragic and meaningful." Norton considered The Painted Veil to be in the spirit of such films as Out of Africa (1985) and The English Patient (1996), seeing it as "rooted in really looking at the way that men and women hurt each other".

Director John Curran suggested setting the film during 1925, when the events of the Chinese nationalist movement were taking place. Norton, who had studied Chinese history at Yale University, agreed with the suggestion. To detail scenes from the time period, Curran, Norton, and Nyswaner relied on excerpts from historian Jonathan Spence's 1969 book To Change China, which covered the inept efforts of Western advisers during these years. Norton said that the character Walter Fane served as "the proxy for the arrogance of Western rationalism." He said that Fane was confused when the Chinese were not grateful for his help, saying "Walter means well, but he's the folly of empire, and that adds a whole new dimension to what happens in the story. It's a metaphor for the way empires get crushed."

Filming
Filming took place on location in Shanghai, China]and in a southern Chinese rural village. The director did not want to build a set for the village beset by cholera, and instead sought a rural area in China. He came across the old quarter of Huangyao (黄姚古镇, huángyáo gǔzhèn) in Guangxi Zhuang Autonomous Region, which then served as the location for the village scenes. The director described the location: "Even the Chinese crew members were amazed at the place we found...It was like going back in time." According to Nyswaner, a large amount of time of the film production was spent negotiating with the Chinese government for the completion of the film, as there were disagreements over issues in the script.

Most of the film was shot in Guangxi. Director John Curran said "We wanted this movie to be distinctly Chinese. We didn’t want it to look like a film that you could shoot in Canada or Mexico or Italy." Line producer Antonia Barnard states that initially the film, like the novel, was to be set in Hong Kong; however, the crew realized Hong Kong of the time period would be difficult to replicate. They altered the story to set the plot in Shanghai; the crew shot "Shanghai for Shanghai in the period, and shot London scenes in Shanghai as well."

Music
The official soundtrack was composed by Alexandre Desplat, and features Lang Lang on the piano.

 "The Painted Veil"
 "Gnossienne No 1" (composed by Erik Satie)
 "Colony Club"
 "River Waltz"
 "Kitty's Theme"
 "Death Convoy"
 "The Water Wheel"
 "The Lovers"
 "Promenade"
 "Kitty's Journey"
 "The Deal"
 "Walter's Mission"
 "The Convent"
 "River Waltz"
 "Morning Tears"
 "Cholera"
 "The End of Love"
 "The Funeral"
 "From Shanghai to London"

There are also three songs not listed on the official soundtrack. All of them are performed by the Choir of the Beijing Takahashi Culture and Art Centre:
 "Le Furet Du Bois Joli" (Composed by Pierre De Berville, Arranged by Evan Chen)
 "À la claire fontaine" (Vocals by N. Porebski / L. Descamps, Piano by Roger Pouly, Courtesy of Les Petits Minous). This is heard after the funeral of Dr. Fane.
 "Reste Avec Moi" (French translation of "Abide with Me", with words by Henry Lyte, Music by William Monk, Arranged by Evan Chen)

Marketing
The film's post-production schedule was slated to conclude in late summer 2006, but did not finish until November. According to Laura Kim, the marketing and publicity head of Warner Independent Pictures, the delay slowed award and media recognition for the film. Other studios were duplicating DVDs of their films for awards organizations, so The Painted Veil was unable to get first priority in processing. When The Painted Veil had a limited release in the United States on December 20, 2006 in the cities of Los Angeles and New York City, the meager marketing campaign for the film was criticized. Half a dozen people associated with the film complained that Warner Independent Pictures conduct of the marketing campaign was failing to gain the film enough attention. Film critic Rex Reed of The New York Observer wrote, "Nobody can understand why Warner Independent Pictures is keeping this movie such a secret; it is filled with Oscar possibilities that should be shouted from the rooftops."

The firing of Mark Gill, one of the initial producers of The Painted Veil and who brought it to Warner Independent Pictures, was cited as a reason for the small scale of the film's marketing campaign. Director John Curran said to Warner Independent "Any transition is not going to be ideal. When the guy who has gotten you on board is gone, you're kind of exposed." Others also criticized the studio for not providing a large enough marketing budget, pointing out that the previous year's Good Night, and Good Luck had a more successful campaign with television and newspaper ads. The Painted Veil eventually expanded to 23 more markets on December 29, 2006, with additional cities on January 5, 2007. Warner Independent hosted 80 screenings of The Painted Veil in Los Angeles, New York, San Francisco, and London as well as to various Hollywood guilds, to promote the film.

Release and reception

Box office
The Painted Veil initially had a limited release in four theaters in the United States on December 20, 2006, grossing $51,086 over the opening weekend. The film gradually expanded its showings in the United States and Canada, peaking at 287 theaters on the weekend of January 26, 2007. The Painted Veil ultimately grossed $8,060,487 in the United States and Canada and $18,850,360 in other territories for a worldwide total of $26,910,847.

Critical reception
On Rotten Tomatoes, the film has received an approval rating of 74% based on 143 reviews. On Metacritic, the film has received a score of 69 out of 100 based on 33 reviews, indicating "generally favorable reviews".

Manohla Dargis of The New York Times wrote the story seems
"so unlikely for modern adaptation, particularly when, as is the case here, it hasn’t been refitted with a contemporary hook or allegory for audiences who wouldn’t know Maugham from Edna Ferber. Instead, as nicely directed by John Curran and adapted to the screen by Ron Nyswaner, this version of the story lulls you by turning Maugham’s distaff bildungsroman into a fine romance. Even better, the new film gives us ample opportunity to spend time with Ms. Watts, whose remarkable talent helps keep movie faith and love alive, even in the tinniest, tiniest vehicles . . . An inveterate stealer and masticator of scenes, Mr. Norton is very fine here, especially early on, before his billing gets the better of the story and he begins riding around heroically on horseback . . . Whether through craft or constitution, [he] invests Walter with a petty cruelty that makes his character’s emotional thaw and Kitty’s predicament all the more poignant."

Carina Chocano of the Los Angeles Times wrote the film "has all the elements in place to be a great epic, but it fails to connect, to paraphrase Maugham's contemporary E.M. Forster, the prose with the passion. It's impeccable, but leaves you cold."

Peter Travers of Rolling Stone rated the film three out of four stars and commented
"If you're suspecting this third movie version of W. Somerset Maugham's 1925 novel may carry the infectious dullness of prestige filmmaking, rest easy...the film is a period piece propelled by emotions accessible to a modern audience...The Painted Veil has the power and intimacy of a timeless love story. By all means, let it sweep you away."

Meghan Keane of The New York Sun wrote the film "may at times threaten to fall into an abyss of sentimentality, and it has moments that seem mere transitions to propel the plot, but it manages a charming historic portrait without insulting the audience's intelligence."

Todd McCarthy of Variety thought the story "feels remote and old-school despite a frankness the two previous film versions lacked." He added
"Present scripter Ron Nyswaner makes some solid fundamental decisions, beginning with the telescoping down to the barest minimum the London-set opening...All the same, the film is still dominated by the stuffy, repressed personality of Fane, whose emotional stonewalling of his wife produces a stifling of Kitty's naturally more vivacious, if common, personality. Despite the extremes of human experience on view, there is a certain blandness to them as they play out, a sensation matched by the eye-catching but picture-postcard-like presentation of the settings...Even the ultra-capable Norton and Watts aren't fully able to galvanize viewer interest in their narrowly self-absorbed characters."

Accolades

Composer Alexandre Desplat won the 2006 Golden Globe Award for Best Original Score. Desplat also won an award for Best Original Score from the Los Angeles Film Critics Association for both The Painted Veil and The Queen (2006).

Ron Nyswaner won the National Board of Review Award for Best Adapted Screenplay and was nominated for the Independent Spirit Award for Best Screenplay but lost to Jason Reitman for Thank You for Smoking.

Edward Norton was nominated for the Independent Spirit Award for Best Male Lead. The San Diego Film Critics Society honored Norton for his work in this movie, The Illusionist, and Down in the Valley.

The London Film Critics' Circle nominated Toby Jones as Best British Supporting Actor of the Year.

References

External links
 
 
 

2006 films
2000s historical romance films
2006 romantic drama films
Adultery in films
American romantic drama films
Chinese drama films
Chinese-language films
Cholera
Films about death
Films based on British novels
Films based on works by W. Somerset Maugham
Films scored by Alexandre Desplat
Films set in China
Films set in London
Films set in Shanghai
Films set in the 1920s
Films set in Venice
Films shot in China
2000s French-language films
American historical romance films
American pregnancy films
Romantic epic films
Warner Independent Pictures films
Films directed by John Curran
Films about infectious diseases
2000s English-language films
2000s American films